Bijauria is a  village in Baheri block of Bareilly district, in Uttar Pradesh, India. The nearest railway station is Bijauria Junction railway station. Bareilly city is 32 km away from the village. According to Census 2011 India the village population is 1532, out of 823 are males and 709 are females.

References

Villages in Bareilly district